Andrés Felipe Ibargüen Andrews (born 14 February 1996) is a Colombian-American basketball player who last played for Club Trouville in the Uruguayan Basketball League (LUB) and the Colombia national basketball team.

College career
Ibargüen played his two seasons at Trinity Valley Community College. He transferred to UT Arlington but sat out the first six games as the NCAA reviewed his eligibility. Ibargüen averaged 6.6 points per game as a junior at UT Arlington. As a senior at Angelo State, Ibargüen tallied 13 double doubles and averaged 14.3 points and 10.4 rebounds per game. He was selected to the All-Texas Division II Team.

Professional career
On 28 August 2020, Ibargüen signed his first contract with Basketball Community Gelderland of the Dutch Basketball League (DBL). The team was later re-named Yoast United. Ibargüen and United reached the final of the 2021 DBL Cup, in which Ibargüen scored a game-high 39 points and 13 rebounds. However, in the end the team lost to BAL by ten points.

National team career
With the Colombia national basketball team, Ibargüen played at the 2016 South American Basketball Championship.

References

Yoast United players
Dutch Basketball League players
1996 births
People from Santa Marta
Living people
Colombian men's basketball players
American men's basketball players
UT Arlington Mavericks men's basketball players
Angelo State Rams men's basketball players
CB Prat players
Sportspeople from Magdalena Department